Robbie Gotts (born 9 November 1999) is an English professional footballer who plays for Barrow, as a midfielder or right-back.

Career
He impressed for Carlos Corberán's Leeds United under 23's side over the course the 2018–19 season, winning the PDL Northern League 2018–19 season, then becoming the national Professional Development League champions by beating Birmingham City in the final.

As of 12 December 2019, he had featured on the first-team substitute's bench over 30 times for the first team, but had yet to make his senior debut. He made his long-awaited debut by starting in the FA Cup on 6 January 2020 in a 1–0 defeat against Premier League side Arsenal at the Emirates Stadium.

After the English professional football season was paused in March 2020 due to Impact of the COVID-19 pandemic on association football, the season was resumed during June, where Gotts earned promotion with Leeds to the Premier League and also become the EFL Championship Champions for the 2019-20 season in July after the successful resumption of the season. 

Gotts won Leeds United’s Academy Player of the Year award at the clubs end of season awards on 24 July 2020.

On 15 October 2020, Gotts joined Lincoln City on a season-long loan deal. He would make his debut at home against Portsmouth on 3 November 2020 and would score his first goal in what would be his final game, a EFL Trophy tie against Accrington Stanley on 12 January 2021. He was recalled by Leeds United a few days later and immediately sent on loan to Salford City for the remainder of the season. He was cup-tied for Salford's victory in the 2020 EFL Trophy Final (played in March 2021).

Gotts left Leeds and signed for Barrow on 31 August 2021. He won Player of the Year in his first season with the Bluebirds.

Style of play
Gotts was primarily a right-back but was converted by Marcelo Bielsa to play as a central midfielder. Bielsa described that he had never seen a player as "dynamic" as Gotts in his career, saying that "he’s a number eight, a midfielder. He is not offensive and not defensive. He's a number eight."

Career statistics

Honours
Individual
Barrow Player of the Year: 2021–22
Leeds United Academy Player of the Year: 2019–20

References

1999 births
Living people
English footballers
Leeds United F.C. players
Lincoln City F.C. players
Salford City F.C. players
Barrow A.F.C. players
English Football League players
Association football midfielders
Association football fullbacks